Kevin William O'Shea (May 28, 1947 — January 18, 2010) was a Canadian professional ice hockey forward. He played in the National Hockey League with the Buffalo Sabres and St. Louis Blues between 1970 and 1973, as well as in the World Hockey Association with the Minnesota Fighting Saints between 1974 and 1975. Prior to his professional career, O'Shea played two years for St. Lawrence University. Internationally he played for the Canadian national team at the 1969 World Championships.

In his NHL career, O'Shea appeared in 133 games, scoring thirteen goals and adding eighteen assists. He is best known for scoring an overtime goal in Game 7 of a playoff quarterfinal series in 1972, leading the Blues past the Minnesota North Stars and into the next round.

He played in 68 WHA games, scoring ten goals and adding ten assists. He did one season in Sweden, representing Timrå IK in Elitserien, establishing a then all-time league record in penalty minutes with 72 PIM in 33 regular season games.

O'Shea died January 18, 2010. Kevin was the brother of Danny O'Shea.

Career statistics

Regular season and playoffs

International

References

External links
 

1947 births
2010 deaths
Buffalo Sabres players
Canadian ice hockey right wingers
Denver Spurs (WHL) players
Minnesota Fighting Saints players
Ontario Hockey Association Senior A League (1890–1979) players
Oshawa Generals players
Phoenix Roadrunners (WHL) players
San Diego Gulls (WHL) players
St. Lawrence Saints men's ice hockey players
St. Louis Blues players
Ice hockey people from Toronto
Timrå IK players